In topology, a topological space  is called a compactly generated space or k-space if its topology is determined by compact spaces in a manner made precise below.  There is in fact no commonly agreed upon definition for such spaces, as different authors use variations of the definition that are not exactly equivalent to each other.  Also some authors include some separation axiom (like Hausdorff space or weak Hausdorff space) in the definition of one or both terms, and others don't.

And other variations of the definition replace compact spaces with compact Hausdorff spaces.

Compactly generated spaces were developed to remedy some of the shortcomings of the category of topological spaces.  In particular, under some of the definitions, they form a cartesian closed category while still containing the typical spaces of interest, which makes them convenient for use in algebraic topology.

Definitions

General framework for the definitions

Let  be a topological space, where  is the topology, that is, the collection of all open sets in 

There are multiple (non-equivalent) definitions of compactly generated space or k-space in the literature.  These definitions share a common structure, starting with a suitably specified family  of continuous maps from some compact spaces to   The various definitions differ in their choice of the family  as detailed below.

In the space  every open set is k-open and every closed set is k-closed.

These different choices for the family of continuous maps into  lead to different definitions of compactly generated space.  Additionally, some authors require  to satisfy a separation axiom (like Hausdorff or weak Hausdorff) as part of the definition, while others don't.  The definitions in this article will not comprise any such separation axiom.

As an additional general note, a sufficient condition that can be useful to show that a space  is compactly generated (with respect to ) is to find a subfamily  such that  is compactly generated with respect to   For coherent spaces, that corresponds to showing that the space is coherent with a subfamily of the family of subspaces.  For example, this provides one way to show that locally compact spaces are compactly generated.

Below are some of the more commonly used definitions in more detail, in increasing order of specificity.

For Hausdorff spaces, all three definitions are equivalent.  So the terminology  is unambiguous and refers to a compactly generated space (in any of the definitions) that is also Hausdorff.

Definition 1

Informally, a space whose topology is determined by its compact subspaces, or equivalently in this case, by all continuous maps from arbitrary compact spaces.

A topological space  is called compactly-generated or a k-space if it satisfies any of the following equivalent conditions:

(2) The topology on  coincides with the final topology with respect to the family of all continuous maps  from all compact spaces 
(3)  is a quotient space of a topological sum of compact spaces.
(4)  is a quotient space of a weakly locally compact space.

As explained in the final topology article, condition (2) is well-defined, even though the family of continuous maps from arbitrary compact spaces is not a set but a proper class.

The equivalence between conditions (1) and (2) follows from the fact that every inclusion from a subspace is a continuous map; and on the other hand, every continuous map  from a compact space  has a compact image  and thus factors through the inclusion of the compact subspace  into

Definition  2

Informally, a space whose topology is determined by all continuous maps from arbitrary compact Hausdorff spaces.

A topological space  is called compactly-generated or a k-space if it satisfies any of the following equivalent conditions:

(1) The topology on  coincides with the final topology with respect to the family of all continuous maps  from all compact Hausdorff spaces   In other words, it satisfies the condition:
(2)  is a quotient space of a topological sum of compact Hausdorff spaces.
(3)  is a quotient space of a locally compact Hausdorff space.

Every space satisfying Definition 2 also satisfies Definition 1.  The converse is not true.  For example, the one-point compactification of the Arens-Fort space is compact and hence satisfies Definition 1, but it does not satisfies Definition 2.

Definition 2 is the one more commonly used in algebraic topology.  This definition is often paired with the weak Hausdorff property to form the category CGWH of compactly generated weak Hausdorff spaces.

Definition 3

Informally, a space whose topology is determined by its compact Hausdorff subspaces.

A topological space  is called compactly-generated or a k-space if its topology is coherent with the family of its compact Hausdorff subspaces; namely, it satisfies the property:

Every space satisfying Definition 3 also satisfies Definition 2. The converse is not true. On the other hand, it satisfies Definition 2 because it is homeomorphic to the quotient space of the compact interval  obtained by identifying all the points in 

By itself, Definition 3 is not quite as useful as the other two definitions as it lacks some of the properties implied by the others.  For example, every quotient space of a space satisfying Definition 1 or Definition 2 is a space of the same kind.  But that does not hold for Definition 3.

However, for weak Hausdorff spaces Definitions 2 and 3 are equivalent.  Thus the category CGWH can also be defined by pairing the weak Hausdorff property with Definition 3, which may be easier to state and work with than Definition 2.

Note: in a previous version of this article spaces satisfying Definition 3 were called "Hausdorff-compactly generated", which was a made up term not reflecting any usage from the literature.  Keeping this here for now, until the rest of the article can be cleaned up.

Motivation

Compactly generated spaces were originally called k-spaces, after the German word kompakt. They were studied by Hurewicz, and can be found in General Topology by Kelley, Topology by Dugundji, Rational Homotopy Theory by Félix, Halperin, and Thomas.

The motivation for their deeper study came in the 1960s from well known deficiencies of the usual category of topological spaces. This fails to be a cartesian closed category, the usual cartesian product of identification maps is not always an identification map, and the usual product of CW-complexes need not be a CW-complex. By contrast, the category of simplicial sets had many convenient properties, including being cartesian closed. The history of the study of repairing this situation is given in the article on the nLab on convenient categories of spaces.

These ideas extend on the de Vries duality theorem. A definition of the exponential object is given below. Another suggestion (1964) was to consider the usual Hausdorff spaces but use functions continuous on compact subsets.

These ideas generalize to the non-Hausdorff case; i.e. with a different definition of compactly generated spaces. This is useful since identification spaces of Hausdorff spaces need not be Hausdorff.

In modern-day algebraic topology, this property is most commonly coupled with the weak Hausdorff property, so that one works in the category CGWH of compactly generated weak Hausdorff spaces.

Examples and counterexamples

Most topological spaces commonly studied in mathematics are (Hausdorff-)compactly generated. In the following the bracketed (Hausdorff) properties and (Hausdorff-) prefixes are meant to be applied together. Generally, if the space is Hausdorff-compactly generated, rather than just compactly generated, then its theorems often require an additional assumption of Hausdorffness somewhere.

 Every Hausdorff-compactly generated space is compactly generated.
 Every (Hausdorff) compact space is (Hausdorff-)compactly generated.
 Every weakly locally compact space is compactly generated.
 Every locally compact Hausdorff space is Hausdorff-compactly generated.
 Every first-countable (Hausdorff) space is (Hausdorff-)compactly generated.
 Topological manifolds are locally compact Hausdorff and therefore Hausdorff-compactly generated.
 Metric spaces are first-countable Hausdorff and therefore Hausdorff-compactly generated Hausdorff.
 Every CW complex is Hausdorff-compactly generated and Hausdorff.
 Every sequential space is a quotient of a metric space and therefore Hausdorff-compactly generated.
Examples of topological spaces that fail to be compactly generated include the following:
 The product space  endowed with the product topology, where the first factor uses the subspace topology while the second factor is the quotient space of  where all natural numbers are identified with a single point.

A subspace of a compactly generated space is not necessarily compact generated.
A Hausdorff space  is compactly generated if and only if it is a quotient of some locally compact space (specifically, it is a quotient of all disjoint union of all compact subspace of ).

Properties

 In a compactly generated space, every closed set is compactly generated. The same does not hold for open sets.
 In a Hausdorff-compactly generated space, every closed set and every open set is Hausdorff-compactly generated.  The same holds more generally for every locally closed set, that is, the intersection of an open set and a closed set.
 A quotient of a (Hausdorff)-compactly generated space is (Hausdorff)-compactly generated.
 A disjoint union of (Hausdorff)-compactly generated spaces is (Hausdorff)-compactly generated.
 A wedge sum of (Hausdorff)-compactly generated spaces is (Hausdorff)-compactly generated.
 The continuity of a map defined on a (Hausdorff-)compactly generated space  can be determined solely by looking at the compact (Hausdorff) subsets of  Specifically, a function  on a (Hausdorff-)compactly generated space  is continuous if and only if the same is true of its restriction  to each compact (Hausdorff) subset 
Therefore, when working in categories of (Hausdorff-)compactly generated spaces it is necessary to define the product as  the k-ification of the product topology (see below).

K-ification

It follows that  is compactly generated.

This construction is functorial.

The above discussion applies also to the Hausdorff-compactly generated spaces after replacing compact with compact Hausdorff, but with the following difference. To prove that the compact Hausdorff subsets of the k-ification are the same as in the original topology (and hence that the k-ification is Hausdorff-compactly generated) requires that the original topology is also k-Hausdorff. The following properties are equivalent:

 Hausdorff-compactly generated k-Hausdorff
 Hausdorff-compactly generated weak Hausdorff
 Compactly generated k-Hausdorff

These ideas can be generalized to the non-Hausdorff case. This is useful since identification spaces of Hausdorff spaces need not be Hausdorff.

See also

Notes

References

External links

 Compactly generated spaces - contains an excellent catalog of properties and constructions with compactly generated spaces
 
 

General topology
Homotopy theory